Oliver Roth (born 30 January 1968) is a German former professional footballer who played as a forward.

References

1968 births
Living people
German footballers
Association football forwards
FSV Frankfurt players
Borussia Dortmund players
Rot-Weiss Frankfurt players
Kickers Offenbach players
Bundesliga players
2. Bundesliga players
German expatriate footballers
Expatriate soccer players in the United States
German expatriate sportspeople in the United States
German football managers
Kickers Offenbach managers
Footballers from Frankfurt